The Lviv Suburban Train Station (Lvivs'kyi prymis'kyi vokzal) is a train station serving the suburban areas of Lviv, as well as the territory of Lviv Oblast.  The Suburban Train Station was built in 1996.

See also
 Lviv Rail Terminal

References

External links
  Lviv State Railway

Buildings and structures in Lviv
Railway stations in Lviv
Railway stations opened in 1996
Railway stations in Lviv Oblast